Debra Berger (born March 17, 1957), sometimes credited as Debby Berger or Deborah Berger, is an American actress, artist, and designer.

Life
She was the daughter of actor William Berger from his first marriage in 1957. She was the half-sister of actress Katya Berger and child actor Kasimir Berger. She is also the stepdaughter of Croatian singer and actress Hanja Kochansky. She was the star of Marcel Carné's La merveilleuse visite.

Personal life
Berger was linked romantically to Alessandro, Principe Ruspoli (December 9, 1924 – January 11, 2005), 9th Principe di Cerveteri, 9th Marchese di Riano, and 14th Conte di Vignanello. They had two sons:
 Tao Ruspoli (born in Bangkok on November 7, 1975). He married actress Olivia Wilde on June 7, 2003 in Washington. They divorced in 2011.
 Bartolomeo Ruspoli (born in Rome on October 6, 1978). He married Aileen Getty, daughter of John Paul Getty, Jr. and his first wife Gail Harris, in November 2004. They have no children. He appeared as himself in his brother's documentary Just Say Know (2002).

Filmography
 Hawaii Five-O (1 episode, The Diamond That Nobody Stole, 1973): Michi Djebara (as Deborah Berger)
 La merveilleuse visite (1974): Déliah (as Deborah Berger)
 Terminal (1974)
 Rosebud (1975): Gertrude
 Parapsycho – Spectrum of Fear (1975): Debbie
 Born for Hell (1976): Bridget (as Debby Berger)
 Emanuelle in Bangkok (1976): Debra
 Una devastante voglia di vincere (1977, TV mini-series)
 The Inglorious Bastards (1978): Nicole
 Nana (1982): Satin
 Dangerously Close (1986): Ms Hoffman
 Invaders from Mars (1986): Corporal Walker
 Lightning, the White Stallion (1986): Lili Castle
 52 Pick-Up (1986): O'Boyle's Wife
 Just Say Know (2002): Herself

See also
 Ruspoli

References

External links
 
 
 Debra Berger's Genealogy on a Portuguese Genealogical site

American people of Austrian descent
American film actresses
American television actresses
1957 births
Living people
21st-century American women